The Pop Tarts is the fourth album by Chicago pop band Green, released in 1992 on Megadisc Records.

Track listing

Personnel
Green
Joe Tech Huppert – piano, organ
Jeff Lescher – guitar, vocals
Mark Mosher – drums, vocals
Clay Tomasek – bass guitar, vocals
Additional musicians and production
Iain Burgess – engineering
Green – production
Jon McGahan – horns
John Mierl – horns

References

1992 albums
Green (band) albums